Mordellistena pallidoptera is a species of beetle in the genus Mordellistena of the family Mordellidae. It was described by Khalaf in 1971.

References

Beetles described in 1971
pallidoptera